Agustí Bartra i Lleonart (1908 – 1982) was a Spanish poet, writer, translator and University Professor in Catalan language.

Biography 
Descendant of a country family, he passed part of his childhood in Sabadell, although he had been born in the city of Barcelona 8 November 1908. When his family came back to Barcelona he entered to work in a textile warehouse. In year 1934 won a competition of social stories, and short time afterwards he started to collaborate in magazines such as Friend and Meridian.

He took part in the Spanish Civil War with the republican side, and  exiled himself at the beginning of 1939: he passed through several refugee camps (Sant Cebrià, Argelers and Agde) before arriving in Roissy-in Brie (Paris), where he met the writer Anna Murià (who was also exile) with whom he would marry and have two children. In 1940 they embarked towards Dominican Republic, and left after to Cuba and to Mexico. In there, they fixed their residence and set up the magazine Lletres (Letters; 1944–1947). Likewise also made stays in the United States of America, especially between 1949–1950, 1960 and 1963, being nominated in year 1969 as professor of Hispano-American poetry at the University of Maryland.

In 1970 they returned to Catalonia; they settled in the city of Terrassa, where he died on 8 July 1982.

In year 1973 his work Els himnes (The hymns) was rewarded with the Prize Carles Riba of poetry, and in 1981 with the Cross of Sant Jordi (granted by the Generalitat de Catalunya). In 1982, Haikús d'Arsinal was rewarded with the Prize of the Criticism of Catalan poetry.

References

External links
 

1908 births
1982 deaths
People from Barcelona
Catalan-language poets
Catalan-language writers
20th-century translators
20th-century Spanish poets